Tomáš Vengřinek (born 8 June 1992) is a Czech football player who plays for FC Baník Ostrava.

Vengřinek has played international football at under-16 level for Czech Republic U16.

External links 
 Player´s profile, FA ČR (Czech)
 Player´s profile, iDNES.cz (Czech)

1992 births
Living people
Czech footballers
FC Baník Ostrava players
Czech First League players
Czech Republic youth international footballers
Association football defenders